Heidi Quante is an interdisciplinary artist who has been designing environmental and human rights public engagement initiatives since 2003.

Education 
Quante attended the University of California, Berkeley and received a Bachelor of Arts in Cultural Anthropology and a Bachelor of Science in Ecology.

Career 
Her artwork is divided into two practices. One is personal, exploring her emotional and physical interactions with the changing environment. The other consciously engages the public in participatory artworks ranging in size from one on one personal interactions to large scale global participatory artworks. Her artworks often address social and environmental issues like climate change.

Organizations

Creative Catalysts 
Quante founded Creative Catalysts in 2013.  Creative Catalysts collaborates with experts from diverse disciplines: art, science, community organizing and multimedia to design new initiatives for social challenges including climate change. Their initiatives seek to raise awareness, inspire dialogue and spark action on pressing social and environmental issues.

High Water Line 
Quante is the co director of High Water Line which supports individuals and communities at various levels to help them realize this innovative way of visualizing climate change.

References

Living people
21st-century American artists
Interdisciplinary artists
Year of birth missing (living people)